Süskind is a Dutch war film directed by Rudolf van den Berg.
The film is based on the life of Walter Süskind and is set in Amsterdam during the Second World War.
The film was released in the Netherlands on 19 January 2012.

Plot 
In Amsterdam during the German occupation of the Netherlands, a group of people, including Walter Süskind, try to help children escape the Holocaust.

Cast 
 Jeroen Spitzenberger as Walter Süskind
 Karl Markovics as Ferdinand aus der Fünten
 Nyncke Beekhuyzen as Hanna Süskind
 Katja Herbers as Fanny Philips
 Nasrdin Dchar as Felix Halverstadt
 Rudolf Lucieer as David Cohen
  as Abraham Asscher
  as 
 Tygo Gernandt as Piet Meerburg

Reception 
Boyd van Hoeij  of Variety magazine called it "a serious-minded, reined-in and slightly airless historical drama that also explores wartime behavior in shades of gray".

References

External links 
 

2012 films
2012 war drama films
2010s Dutch-language films
Dutch war drama films
Holocaust films
Films based on actual events
Films set in Amsterdam
Films directed by Rudolf van den Berg
2012 drama films
Dutch World War II films